The Candy Spooky Theater (ザ キャンディー スプーキー シアター) was a Japanese visual kei rock band, who debuted in 2005 with the single "Pumpkins Scream in the Dead of Night Parade". The band was made up of three members: Jack Spooky, Kal Bone Jr., and Peggy Giggles, and their music was driven by Tim Burton-like horror influences under the concept of "Comical Horror Halloween Party".

History
The band formed in February 2003 by Jack Spooky, but prior to that Jack Spooky and Peggy were in a band together called Dororo (however, then Jack was known as Shati and Peggy was known as MeiLa (迷La)). The band later in 2004 started to release music, under their own label called Candy Makers (CM(S)).

They debuted with the four-track single "Pumpkins Scream in the Dead of Night Parade", which was limited to 1,000 copies. From there on, they released three more singles and were featured on a three-track single called "Mikkai". They have also released their first full-length album, Living Dead Spooky Doll's Family in the Rock n' Childs Spook Show Baby!!, on March 23, 2007, through the German record label Trisol.

They finished their first U.S. tour called Comical Horror's Wonder Land East Coast Showcase Tour which ran from May 20–22, 2007.

They released their most recent work, SpookyWonderland, on October 1, 2010.

The band announced the cessation of "all activities with the performance of the June 6, 2014".

Members
Current
Jack Spooky – vocals, programming
Peggy Giggles – bass guitar
Kal Bone Jr. – guitar

Past
Zull – guitar (left May 2007, moved to Monaural Curve)
Kiddy Skeleton – guitar (left September 2008)

Discography
Albums
 Living Dead Spooky Doll's Family in the Rock n' Childs Spook Show Baby!! (2007.03.23)
 SpookyWonderland (2010.10.01)

'Singles
 "Pumpkins Scream in the Dead of Night Parade" (2004.03.21)
 "Wonderland" (2005.09.09)
 "Murderland" (2005.10.31)
 "The Bedroom" (2006.07.05)
 "Prince of Darkness" (2007.10.01)
 "The Haunted House" (2009.02.02)

Other
 Mikkai (蜜会; A Sweet, Secret Meeting) (#2 Murder Factory in the Closet) (2006.05.06)

References

Further reading
Orcus No. 3 March 2007 pgs 24 - 28 (German)
Orcus No. 4 April 2007 pgs 105 - 107 (German)

External links
 
 Official MySpace

Visual kei musical groups
Japanese dark wave musical groups
Japanese industrial rock musical groups
Japanese experimental rock groups
Musical groups established in 2003
2003 establishments in Japan